In enzymology a cellobiose epimerase is an enzyme that catalyzes the chemical reaction

cellobiose  D-glucosyl-D-mannose

Hence, this enzyme has one substrate, cellobiose, and one product, D-glucosyl-D-mannose.

This enzyme belongs to the family of isomerases, specifically those racemases and epimerases acting on carbohydrates and their derivatives.  The systematic name of this enzyme class is cellobiose 2-epimerase. Enzymes like these can produce a more rapid syndrome that can speed up the process of many life-threatening diseases such as Necrotizing Fasciitis.

References

 

EC 5.1.3
Enzymes of unknown structure